is a Japanese holding company that was established on December 1, 2007, as a result of a merger between the Japanese anime studio Production I.G and manga publisher Mag Garden.

History 
The merger between Production I.G and Mag Garden was announced on July 4, 2007. Production I.G was transformed into a holding company a month ahead of the scheduled merger on December 1, 2007. Along with a name change, it transferred most of its former duties and management to a newly developed subsidiary also named "Production I.G". After the merger with Mag Garden by the stock exchange, IG Port now fully owned the "new" Production I.G, Mag Garden, and Xebec as its subsidiaries.

On September 19, 2014, IG Port announced that it would be forming a new animation production subsidiary, named Signal.MD, with a capital of million. The company stated that the goal of the new subsidiary would be to "develop technology for full digital animation and smart devices" and "build the foundation for the production of animation aimed at children and families". It was established in October 2014, with Katsuji Morishita of Production I.G serving as its president.

On November 20, 2018, IG Port announced that the production operations of Xebec would be transferred to Sunrise, citing that the studio's primary business (production for animation and other on-screen works) "has been running a deficit for a long time" and its revenue from licensing business "has not made up for the shortfall." The company finalized the transfer of the studio, with its cost amounting million, on April 1, 2019.

IG Port earned more than billion in revenue for the first time in a single fiscal year when the company reported billion in revenue on July 14, 2022, for the fiscal year starting in June 2021 and ending in May 2022. The company's profit decreased by 99% to million, which was attributed to "unifying its income from streaming projects and licensing sales with its amortization expenses". The company stated that the decrease in net income should return to normal in the upcoming fiscal year.

References

External links 
  

 
Anime companies
Mass media in Tokyo
Companies listed on the Tokyo Stock Exchange
Holding companies of Japan
Holding companies established in 2007
Japanese companies established in 2007